English College may refer to:

Educational institutions 
 Christian English College, Chhatarpur, a private school in Chhatarpur, India
 Dubai English Speaking College, a British private school in Dubai, Emirates
 English College Dubai, an independent secondary school in Dubai, Emirates
 English College in Prague, a Czecho-British secondary school in Prague, Czechia
 English College Johore Bahru, an old premier school in Johor, Malaysia, also known as Maktab Sultan Abu Bakar
 Stonyhurst College, a coeducational Roman Catholic independent school in Lancashire, United Kingdom which was founded as English Jesuit College at St Omer
 Tallinn English College, a general education school in Tallinn, Estonia
 Türk Maarif Koleji, an influential selective secondary education institute in Nicosia, Northern Cyprus which used the name English College from 1968 to 1973

Religious institutions 
 English College of St Gregory, a past Roman Catholic seminary in Seville, Spain, closed in 1767
 English College, Douai, a past Catholic seminary in Douai, France, closed in 1793
 English College, Lisbon, a past Roman Catholic seminary in Lisbon, Portugal, closed in 1973
 English College, Valladolid, a residence and training centre for the training of Catholic priests in Valladolid, Spain
 English College, Rome, a Roman Catholic seminary in Rome, Italy